Feel Special may refer to:

 Feel Special (2019), EP by Twice.
 «Feel Special» (2019), single from previous EP.